The Gone Game is an Indian psychological thriller miniseries directed by Nikhil Bhat, starring Sanjay Kapoor, Shweta Tripathi, Shriya Pilgaonkar and Arjun Mathur. It was shot almost entirely within the confines of their homes and directed remotely, during the COVID-19 pandemic in India. It premiered on Voot on 20 August 2020. Second season released on 7th of July 2022.

Plot
The series starts with Sahil's condition and visible symptoms of being COVID-19 positive. Later episodes try to showcase multiple threads and the plot line gets messier with each episode.

Cast
Sanjay Kapoor as Rajeev Gujral
Shweta Tripathi as Amara Gujral
Arjun Mathur as Sahil Gujral
Shriya Pilgaonkar as Suhani Gujral
Lubna Salim as Barkha Kapoor
Rukhsar Rehman as Suneeta Gujral
Dibyendu Bhattacharya as Subhash Chaudhary
Indraneil Sengupta as Prateek Jindal
Harleen Sethi as Sharmila Gupta (Season 2)

Episodes

Reception
Jyoti Kanyal from India Today gave her review on the series at the same time appreciated the minimal production used for the shoot, and also wrote about the relatability of the series with the audience because of the COVID-19 pandemic. Rohan Naahar from Hindustan Times shared his mixed reviews, he acknowledged the strong cast, and praised the unique plot. Shubhra Gupta from The Indian Express stated the series as an interesting experiment and highlights one point which the series reflects clearly, that we are prisoners of our digital devices. Devasheesh Pandey from News 18 stated the series as a good representation of Covid-19 along with an interesting thriller plot.

References

External links
 

Psychological thriller web series
2020 Indian television series debuts
2020 Indian television series endings
Indian television miniseries
2020s Indian television miniseries
Television shows about the COVID-19 pandemic
Television episodes about the COVID-19 pandemic
Indian thriller television series
Hindi-language web series
Viacom 18
Network18 Group
COVID-19 pandemic in India
Impact of the COVID-19 pandemic in India
Indian drama web series
Screenlife films